Ye Haiyan (born 1975) is a Chinese gender activist, best known for her action in favor of women, prostitutes, and children against violence and sexual aggression. In May of 2012, her NGO office in Guangxi was raided by eight plainclothes men who also reportedly attacked her. Haiyan said after the attack that she presumed the men had been sent by the local government. On 27 May 2013, she campaigned against a school director in Hainan accused of raping six female students, aged 12 to 13. She held a sign that read: "Principal, call me if you want to get a room. Leave the pupils alone." This helped to raise bring attention to this specific case, sparking national outrage via the Internet. Artist Ai Weiwei and filmmaker Ai Xiaoming have supported her campaign. In response to her activism, Ye has reported pressure, threats, and attacks, and she was arrested in June 2013. She is one of the subjects of the 2016 documentary film Hooligan Sparrow. In May 2014, she was attacked in her home and arrested for being a whistleblower. She exposed the harsh conditions of local brothels, which sex workers were sexually and physically abused.

References

External links
Documentary about Ye, titled Hooligan Sparrow, streaming at PBS

Chinese activists
Chinese women activists
Sexuality in China
1975 births
Living people
Chinese women's rights activists